Pipestone Creek is a  river in southwestern Minnesota and northeastern South Dakota.

Course
Pipestone Creek has a center branch as well as branches named "North" and "South". The creek approaches the town of Pipestone from the east, but turns northwesterly just before Highway 23 meets U.S. Highway 75, with the creek going under both highways in rapid succession. Flowing through Pipestone National Monument, the creek passes over Winnewissa Falls, and then enters the adjacent State DNR controlled "Pipestone Wildlike Management Area" where a small "impoundment" (dam) forms "Indian Lake". The creek continues northwesterly until turning southwesterly just east of County Road 53. On the west side of County Rd 53, and on the North side of Country Rd 5, it is joined by the North branch, and on the south side of the same road, the South branch joins. The creek continues southwesterly, and crosses the state line in South Dakota above the road known as 81st Street in Minnesota and 236th A Street in South Dakota. It does not travel far into South Dakota, but loops back into Minnesota, flowing into Split Rock Creek within a mile of the state line, this confluence about 3 miles north of Sherman, South Dakota, also being 3 miles south of Jasper, Minnesota. Split Rock Creek itself is a tributary of the Big Sioux River, which in turn flows via the Missouri River and Mississippi River to the Gulf of Mexico.

History
The creek was named for deposits of pipestone along its course.

See also
List of rivers of Minnesota
List of rivers of South Dakota

References

External links
Minnesota Watersheds
USGS Geographic Names Information Service
USGS Hydrologic Unit Map - State of Minnesota (1974)

Rivers of Minnesota
Rivers of South Dakota
Tributaries of the Mississippi River
Rivers of Pipestone County, Minnesota
Rivers of Minnehaha County, South Dakota